The Battle of I-10 is the name given to the New Mexico State–UTEP football rivalry. It is a college rivalry game between New Mexico State University (NMSU) and the University of Texas at El Paso (UTEP). It is called the Battle of I-10 because the two universities are located along Interstate 10 connecting Las Cruces and El Paso. The teams compete for the Silver Spade Trophy and the Mayor's Cup.

Football
The 104–year-old series between the New Mexico State Aggies and the UTEP Miners has had many exciting finishes in its storied history. Although UTEP holds the series lead at 57–38–2, largely due to dominance in the series from the 1920s to the 1960s, UTEP's advantage is 8–3 since 2009.

The winner of the annual matchup receives a pair of traveling trophies. The older of the two is known as the Silver Spade and dates to 1955.  The trophy is a replica of a prospector's shovel from an abandoned mine in the Organ Mountains. The Mayor's Cup was added in 1982 and is nicknamed the Brass Spittoon.

Due to the close proximity of the campuses it was natural for a rivalry to develop. The Texas College of Mines played its first ever game against a collegiate opponent versus New Mexico A&M in 1914 and, with few exceptions, including during World War I and World War II, the teams would meet again every year. Following World War II, the series resumed on an annual basis from 1946 until 2001, when UTEP's administration made the controversial decision to cancel their scheduled trip to Las Cruces in favor of scheduling an additional home contest against a Division I-AA opponent. The schools agreed to meet again in 2002 (a 49–14 New Mexico State win, their biggest blowout of the Miners since 1922), but did not play again until 2004 in El Paso when the Miners exacted revenge for their blowout loss two years prior with a 45–0 pasting of the Aggies, the most lopsided result in the series in 55 years. The blowout marked the beginning of a three-game winning streak for UTEP in the rivalry. The tide of the series then seemingly turned back in the Aggies' favor, as New Mexico State defeated UTEP the next two years, their first back-to-back wins over UTEP since 1994 and 1995. The Aggies edged the Miners 34–33 on September 20, 2008 at the Sun Bowl for their first win in El Paso since 1994. However, the most recent three games in the series have gone back to the Miners, with UTEP defeating NMSU at Aggie Memorial Stadium 38–12 on September 19, 2009 (only their second win in the Mesilla Valley since 1991), topping the Aggies 42–10 at the Sun Bowl on September 18, 2010, and again defeating the Aggies 16–10 on September 17, 2011 in Las Cruces for their first back-to-back road wins in the series since winning four straight games in Las Cruces between 1986 and 1991.

In August 2020, New Mexico State postponed football and fall sports due to COVID-19. However, UTEP and Conference USA proceeded with fall football. As a result, in 2020, the Battle of I-10 had no football game for the first time since 2003.

On November 5, 2021, New Mexico State announced it would be joining UTEP in Conference USA in all sports including football starting in 2023. This will mark the first time in over 60 years that the Battle of I-10 will be played as a conference game; before this, the last time this happened was in 1961, with both schools as members of the now defunct Border Conference.

Notable statistics
 From 1920 to 1951, UTEP hosted 22 of 28 games.
 Before 1927, New Mexico State dominated the first 10 games with a record of 8–1–1.
 From 1927 to 1967, UTEP dominated the series with a record of 29–7–1.
 New Mexico State's back-to-back victories in 1960–1961 were its first since 1937–1938.
 As of 2011, UTEP has won on the road 17 times, while New Mexico State has won on the road 16 times.
 There have been 2 ties in the series, once in El Paso in 1925 and once in Las Cruces in 1952.
 The September 26, 1998 game at Aggie Memorial Stadium set the all-time attendance record for any football game at the stadium with 32,993 in attendance.
 The September 25, 1999 game at Sun Bowl set a new attendance record for that stadium with 52,247 which surpasses all Sun Bowl games and NFL Exhibition games ever played there. However, since then 2 regular season UTEP games have surpassed that attendance.
 The two most record breaking lopsided victories in the rivalry:
 November 11, 1922 – New Mexico State 64, UTEP 0
 November 25, 1948 – UTEP 92, New Mexico State 7

Game results
Note: UTEP was known as the Texas School of Mines and Metallurgy prior to 1949 and Texas Western College from 1949–1967 and New Mexico State was known as New Mexico College of Agriculture and Mechanic Arts prior to 1960. Both schools are listed under their modern abbreviations for all games.

 Non-conference games (75: 1914–1933 and 1962–present)
 Not played in 10 seasons (1917–1919, 1934, 1943–1945, 2001, 2003 and 2020)

Coaching records
Since first game on October 31, 1914

New Mexico State

UTEP

 Tommy Dwyer's overall record in series was 2–0–0
 Mike Price's overall record in series is 7–2

Basketball
The New Mexico State and UTEP men's basketball programs share remarkably similar histories and have played an extremely competitive series of games against one another. The programs both experienced their greatest national prominence in the late 1960s and early 1970s, when both schools were led by young up-and-coming coaches who would eventually win more than 700 games (Lou Henson at New Mexico State, Don Haskins at UTEP) and appeared in the NCAA tournament's Final Four within four years of each other. UTEP (then still known as Texas Western) won the 1966 national title while New Mexico State advanced to the 1970 national semifinal before falling to UCLA, but won the consolation game to finish the season third in the nation. Both programs returned to national prominence in the early 1990s with the Aggies and Miners both advancing to the NCAA Tournament's "Sweet Sixteen" in 1992. New Mexico State has appeared in the NCAA Tournament 18 times to UTEP's 17 appearances, and New Mexico State has advanced to the Sweet Sixteen five times to UTEP's four (although three of New Mexico State's appearances in the early 1990s, including the 1992 Sweet Sixteen run, have since been vacated by the NCAA due to rules violations). Most recently, both schools won conference titles and advanced to the NCAA tournament in 2010.

There is some discrepancy between the two schools on the all-time series record as well as the number of all-time meetings between the schools. Entering the 2017–18 season New Mexico State records show that the schools have met 200 times, with New Mexico State holding a 109–103 all time advantage, while UTEP records show 201 meetings with New Mexico State's advantage at 108–104. Uniquely among non-conference rivalries, the schools traditionally play a two-game home-and-home series each season, unlike most other non-conference rivalry series where a single meeting per season is the norm. UTEP swept the 2010–11 series between the schools, winning 73–56 on November 23, 2010 in El Paso and 74–72 on November 30, 2010 in Las Cruces. The Aggies defeated the Miners 89–73 in the first meeting of the 2011–12 season series on November 19, 2011 at the Pan American Center in Las Cruces. And later in the second meeting of 2011–12 basketball season the Miners defeated the Aggies 73–69 on December 11, 2011 at the Don Haskins Center in El Paso to split the season series.

See also
 List of NCAA college football rivalry games

References

1914 establishments in New Mexico
1914 establishments in Texas
College football rivalries in the United States
Recurring sporting events established in 1914
New Mexico State Aggies football
UTEP Miners football